The women's volleyball tournament at the 2019 Southeast Asian Games was held at the PhilSports Arena in Pasig.

Draw
No draw was made following the withdrawal of Malaysia leaving the number of participating team to four. Myanmar and Timor Leste also expressed interest for their potential participation but decided not to enter. Singapore also withdrew.

Participating nations

Results

Preliminary round

|}

|}

Final round

Bronze medal match

|}

Gold medal match

|}

Final standings

See also
Men's tournament

References

External links
  

Women's tournament
Southeast Asian Games